Paul Merriman is a Canadian politician, who was elected to the Legislative Assembly of Saskatchewan in the 2011 election. He represents the electoral district of Saskatoon Silverspring-Sutherland as a member of the Saskatchewan Party caucus. He is also the Minister of Health.

He is the son of Ted Merriman, also a former Saskatchewan Party MLA.

References

21st-century Canadian politicians
Living people
Members of the Executive Council of Saskatchewan
Politicians from Saskatoon
Politicians from Toronto
Saskatchewan Party MLAs
Year of birth missing (living people)